The 1877 Mississippi gubernatorial election took place on November 6, 1877, in order to elect the Governor of Mississippi. Incumbent Governor John Marshall Stone ran for election to a first full term. Stone had become governor a year prior, after the resignation of Adelbert Ames.

General election
In the general election, Stone ran unopposed.

Results

References

1877
gubernatorial
Mississippi
November 1877 events